In enzymology, a phosphonate dehydrogenase is an enzyme that catalyzes the chemical reaction

phosphonate + NAD+ + H2O  phosphate + NADH + H+

The 3 substrates of this enzyme are phosphonate, NAD+, and H2O, whereas its 3 products are phosphate, NADH, and H+.

This enzyme belongs to the family of oxidoreductases, specifically those acting on phosphorus or arsenic in donor with NAD+ or NADP+ as acceptor.  The systematic name of this enzyme class is phosphonate:NAD+ oxidoreductase. Other names in common use include NAD:phosphite oxidoreductase, and phosphite dehydrogenase.

References

 
 

EC 1.20.1
NADH-dependent enzymes
Enzymes of unknown structure